"I was glad" (Latin incipit, "Laetatus sum") is a choral introit which is a popular piece in the musical repertoire of the Anglican church. It is traditionally sung in the Church of England as an anthem at the Coronation of the British monarch.

The text consists of verses from Psalm 122. Numerous composers have set the words to music, among them Henry Purcell and William Boyce; its most famous setting was written in 1902 by Sir Hubert Parry, which sets only verses 1–3, 6, and 7.

Text
The text of the anthem consists of verses from Psalm 122, from the psalter found in the 1662 Book of Common Prayer:

 I was glad when they said unto me : We will go into the house of the Lord.
 Our feet shall stand in thy gates : O Jerusalem.
 Jerusalem is built as a city : that is at unity in itself.
 For thither the tribes go up, even the tribes of the Lord : to testify unto Israel, to give thanks unto the Name of the Lord.
 For there is the seat of judgement : even the seat of the house of David.
 O pray for the peace of Jerusalem : they shall prosper that love thee.
 Peace be within thy walls : and plenteousness within thy palaces.
 For my brethren and companions' sakes : I will wish thee prosperity.
 Yea, because of the house of the Lord our God : I will seek to do thee good.

Most of the content of the psalm is a prayer for the peace and prosperity of Jerusalem, and its use in the coronation service clearly draws a parallel between Jerusalem and the United Kingdom, as William Blake had in his poem "And did those feet in ancient time" ("Jerusalem") (which Parry set to music in 1916).

Use at coronations

The anthem "Laetatus sum" has been sung at the entrance of the monarch at every British coronation since that of King Charles I. Settings for earlier coronations were composed by Henry Purcell and William Boyce, among others. Thomas Attwood's setting was written for the coronation of King George IV in 1821. Parry's version was composed for the coronation of King Edward VII in 1902, and revised in 1911 for that of King George V, when the familiar introduction was added. This setting employs antiphonal choir effects and brass fanfares.

Acclamation
Apart from the imperial splendour of the music, the chief innovation is the incorporation in the central section of the acclamations "Vivat Rex ... " or "Vivat Regina ... " ("Long live King/Queen ...") with which the King's or Queen's Scholars of Westminster School have traditionally greeted the entrance of the monarch since the coronation of King James II in 1685. This section, which has to be rewritten every time a new monarch is crowned – because the Sovereign (and his Consort) is mentioned by name – is generally omitted when the anthem is performed on other occasions. At the coronation of a king and queen, the vivat for the queen precedes that for the king. Parry indicated in the score scope for an improvisatory fanfare between the two, should the length of the procession and timing require it: the Scholars shout their greeting as the Sovereign (and his Consort) pass through the Quire and up into the Theatre. At the last coronation, that of Elizabeth II in 1953, the acclamation took the form of "Vivat Regina Elizabetha".

The acclamation section is not sung with standard Latin pronunciation, but with a variant known as Anglicised Latin.

At the first performance of Parry's arrangement at the 1902 coronation, the director of music, Sir Frederick Bridge, misjudged the timing and had finished the anthem before the King had arrived, having to repeat it when the right moment came. Bridge was saved by the organist, Walter Alcock, who improvised in the interim.

At other events
Parry's setting of "I was glad" was performed on 29 April 2011 at the Westminster Abbey wedding of Prince William and Catherine Middleton as the processional music for the bride and her father and the bridal attendants. It had previously been performed at the wedding of the Duke's parents, Prince Charles and Diana Spencer in 1981.

Notable settings

Latin text

 Alessandro Scarlatti wrote at least four settings, one for four unaccompanied voices.
 Heinrich Ignaz Franz Biber wrote three known settings, a seven part setting (C. 9) and two four part settings in his Vesperae longiores ac breviores (C. 21 & C. 31).
 Marc-Antoine Charpentier wrote a setting (H.161) in 1671. and a second (H.216) ca. 1693–94.
 Michael Haydn wrote two settings, in B-flat major (MH 480), and in F major (MH 519).
 It is the third Psalm of Monteverdi's Vespro della Beata Vergine.
 It is the third Psalm of Vivaldi's Vespro per la Vergine, RV607.
 It is the third Psalm of all Tridentine Vespers of Sundays and Feasts.
 Jules Van Nuffel set the psalm, Laetatus sum, for mixed choir and organ in 1935.

English text

William Child and Thomas Tomkins probably wrote a setting of it for the coronation of King Charles II in 1661.
Henry Purcell and John Blow probably wrote a setting of it for the coronation of King James II in 1685.
Francis Pigott wrote a setting of it for the coronation of Queen Anne in 1702, also used at the coronation of King George I in 1714 and probably intended for King George II in 1727 but omitted by mistake.
William Boyce wrote a setting of it for the coronation of King George III in 1761.
Richard Woodward wrote a setting of it.
Thomas Attwood wrote a setting of it for the coronation of King George IV in 1821, also used for King William IV in 1831 and Queen Victoria in 1838.
Sir Hubert Parry wrote a setting of it for the coronation of King Edward VII in 1902. This has been used at every British coronation since.
Notable modern settings include those by S. Drummond Wolff (1955), Robin Orr (1957), Healey Willan (1962), Peter Hallock (1971).
Part of the text commencing "O pray for the peace of Jerusalem" has been set by Thomas Tomkins, John Blow, John Goss (1879), Herbert Howells (1933).

See also

 Laetare Sunday, which uses a similar introit

References

External links

 , Choir of St Paul's Cathedral at the 2002 Golden Jubilee of Elizabeth II

Christian songs
Psalm settings
Compositions by Hubert Parry
Coronations of British monarchs